Riverside is a census-designated place in Bingham County, Idaho, United States.  Its population was 838 as of the 2010 census.

Demographics

References

Census-designated places in Bingham County, Idaho
Census-designated places in Idaho